Occasional protests took place in Iraq during the years 2015–2018, in Baghdad and more southern Iraqi  cities like Najaf, Nasriyah and Basra, over state corruption and political paralysis and deadlock, poverty, unemployment, power shortages, water shortages around Basra, failing public services, etc..

Background 
In 2014, Iraq's election led to a fractured parliament and inability to quickly form a government. Following frustration at the lack of progress, Muqtada al-Sadr promised to lead a sit-in near parliament within the Green Zone in calling for reforms to end corruption. Despite attempts by Prime Minister Haider al-Abadi to re-shuffle his cabinet, he carried out the threat for a short period before calling on his supporters to disperse. The political instability in the country had been disconcerting to foreign governments, especially amongst rumours of former Prime Minister Nouri al-Maliki political maneuvering. The U.S. had earlier called for the replacement of al-Maliki as prime minister as a condition for fighting ISIL. A few days before the protests, parliament failed to reach a quorum to approve new ministers to replace the current government. Al-Abadi warned that a failure to form a new government would hurt the war against ISIL.

Timeline

2015 protests 
On 16 July, clashes between police and demonstrators led to the death of one young man, with two others wounded.

On 2 August, hundreds took to the streets in the southern cities of Nasriyah and Najaf to protest over poor living conditions, including power shortages, and urged authorities to fight widespread corruption.

On 7 August, tens of thousands of protesters took to the streets to demand changes to the government in central Tahrir Square and jammed the main streets around it, some calling on Prime Minister Abadi to fire corrupt ministers.

2016 protests 
On 30 April 2016, thousands of protesters entered the Green Zone in Baghdad and occupied the Iraqi parliament building. This happened after the Iraqi parliament did not approve new government ministers. The protesters included supporters of Shia cleric Muqtada Al Sadr. Although Iraqi security forces were present, they did not attempt to stop the protesters from entering the parliament building.

Breaching of Green Zone and parliament 
Shortly after al-Sadr ended a news conference in Najaf where he condemned the political deadlock and warned that "either corrupt [officials] and quotas remain or the entire government will be brought down and no one will be exempt from that" and that he would take a two-month withdrawal from public life as he was "waiting for the great popular uprising and the major revolution to stop the march of the corrupt"; though he did not order his supporters to enter the Green Zone, Shia protesters breached the barricades at the Green Zone and stormed the Iraqi parliament building. After crossing a bridge across the Tigris River, a guard at a checkpoint reported that the protesters had not been searched before entering, while television footage showed them waving the flag of Iraq whiles some were standing on top of concrete blast walls at the outer barrier to the Green Zone. They chanted "the cowards ran away," in reference to MPs leaving parliament. While there were scenes of rioting, other protesters shouted "peacefully, peacefully" as they tried to contain the destruction. Some of the protesters pulled barbed wire across a road leading to one of the exits from the Green Zone, while several vehicles believed to belong to MPs were attacked and damaged. While there were no clashes with the security forces, an army special forces unit was dispatched with armoured vehicles and all entrances to the city of Baghdad were shut "as a precautionary measure to maintain the capital’s security," according to an unnamed security official, although no curfew had been imposed. Hundreds of protesters were seen dancing, waving Iraqi flags and chanting pro-al-Sadr slogans, while others appeared to be breaking furniture. Security was also increased at state institutions such as the headquarters for the Central Bank of Iraq and the airport.

The security forces declared a state of emergency in Baghdad soon after the protesters broke through cordons to enter the Green Zone.

Reactions 
President Fuad Masum called on the protesters to leave the parliament building but added: "Burying the regime of party and sectarian quotas cannot be delayed." Sheikh Muhanad al-Gharrawi, an al-Sadr spokesman, also said that al-Sadr had called on his supporters to evacuate the parliament building and set up tents outside. "Negotiations are ongoing between security and government officials and protesters’ representatives to make sure their demands are met."

2017 protests 
On 11 February, at least five protesters and two policeman have been killed in Baghdad when thousands of people took part in a rally. At least 320 protesters and seven police officers were wounded as violence gripped the rally. Late on that day, there were reports that six or seven Katyusha-type rockets were fired at the Green Zone from within Baghdad. No people claim responsibility and there no casualties reported. Moreover, Iraqi security forces had sealed off routes leading to the capital’s fortified Green Zone after the protests.

On 24 March, thousands of anti-government protesters filled up the streets of downtown Baghdad with Muqtada al-Sadr threatened to boycott the upcoming provincial elections, urging followers to join a "reform revolution."

2018 protests 
On 15 July 2018, protests erupted in southern and central Iraq, with protesters burning the headquarters of Kataib Hezbollah in Najaf and sacking the city's airport. Protesters in southern Iraq blockaded the border with Kuwait and occupied several oilfields. In response to the mass unrest, flights from Iran to Najaf were diverted, and the Iraqi Army redeployed forces in the north that were engaging ISIL and the White Flags group to the south to counter the rise in unrest. During protests in Basra two demonstrators were killed by Iraq's security apparatus, and protesters in Sadr City stormed the headquarters of the Iranian backed Badr Organization. On the next day, protesters in Basra began burning pictures of Khomeini and continued to storm the political offices of the Islamic Dawa Party, Badr Organization, and the National Wisdom Movement, the protesters also demonstrated against Iranian drainage of the Shatt al-Arab waterway, which has caused water in southern Iraq to become saline. The government started to crack down on the increasing violence during the protests, and there were eight reported deaths among the protesters. On 21 July, a Badr Organization militiaman killed a 20-year-old protester in the city of Al Diwaniyah.

On 3 September, Iraqi security forces killed Makki Yassir al-Kaabi, an Iraqi tribesman protesting near the provincial capital in Basra; in response to his death many tribesmen from Banu Ka'b threatened to take up arms against the Iraqi government. A few days later, at least 7 people were killed and 30 wounded after a protest about the lack of public services in Basra was fired upon by security forces. On 8 September, an unknown group fired 4 Katyusha rockets at Basra Airport, no injuries or casualties were reported. The US consulate was situated at the airport, and it expressed concern for the developments in Iraq. No one had claimed responsibility for the rocket attack.

In October, two bodies of activists were found in Basra and suspected to be victims of assassinations carried out by Iranian-backed militias.

On 17 November, Sheikh Wessam al-Gharrawi, a leading figure during the protests against deteriorating public utilities and water contamination, was killed by unknown attackers outside his house in central Basra.

On 5 December, protesters demonstrating in Basra wore high-visibility vests, inspired by the French yellow vests movement. They demanded more job opportunities and better services. Iraqi security forces responded by firing live ammunition at the protesters, but no injuries were reported.

References

Protests in Iraq
2010s in Baghdad
2015 in Iraq
Iraqi protests
2016 in Iraq
Iraqi protests
2017 in Iraq
Iraqi protests
2018 in Iraq
Iraqi protests
Iraq